Nurul Sriyankem (born 8 February 1992), simply known as Nu, is a Thai professional footballer who plays as a winger for Customs United in Thai League 2.

International career
He represented Thailand U23 in the 2014 Asian Games. Nurul is also part of Thailand's squad in the 2014 AFF Suzuki Cup. In May 2015, he was called up by Thailand to play in the 2018 FIFA World Cup qualification (AFC) against Vietnam. He won the 2015 Southeast Asian Games with Thailand U23. In 2018 he was called up by Thailand national team for the 2018 AFF Suzuki Cup.

International

International goals

Under-23

Honours

Club
Port
 Thai FA Cup (1): 2019

International
Thailand U-23
 SEA Games  Gold Medal (1); 2015

References

External links

Living people
1992 births
Nurul Sriyankem
Nurul Sriyankem
Nurul Sriyankem
Nurul Sriyankem
Association football wingers
Nurul Sriyankem
Nurul Sriyankem
Nurul Sriyankem
Nurul Sriyankem
Nurul Sriyankem
Nurul Sriyankem
Footballers at the 2014 Asian Games
Nurul Sriyankem
Southeast Asian Games medalists in football
Competitors at the 2015 Southeast Asian Games
Nurul Sriyankem